was a Japanese daimyō of the mid-Edo period, who ruled the Oshi Domain.

Masayoshi served as Kyoto Shoshidai.

|-

1769 births
1808 deaths
Daimyo
Kyoto Shoshidai